Aquamicrobium defluvii is a gram-negative, oxidase- and catalase-positive, bacteria from the genus of Aquamicrobium which was isolated from activated sewage sludge in Germany. Oxygen can be used as a terminal electron accpetor. Different carbons were tested but only a few sugars, fatty acids and thiophene 2-carboxylate supported growth (Bambauer, A. 1998) The genomic information about these species is limited and more research is needed (Wang, X 2015). . Aquamicrobium defluvii uses thiophene-2-carboxylate as only source for carbon.

References

https://link.springer.com/article/10.1007/s002030050575

  Wang, X., Jin, D., Zhou, L., & Zhang, Z. (2015). Draft Genome Sequence of Aquamicrobium defluvii Strain W13Z1, a Psychrotolerant Halotolerant Hydrocarbon-Degrading Bacterium. Genome Announcements, 3(4). https://doi.org/10.1128/genomeA.00984-15

External links
Type strain of Aquamicrobium defluvii at BacDive -  the Bacterial Diversity Metadatabase

Phyllobacteriaceae
Bacteria described in 1998